Nivkh (occasionally also Nivkhic; self-designation: Нивхгу диф, Nivxgu dif), or Gilyak, or Amuric, is a small language family, often portrayed as a language isolate, of two or three mutually unintelligible languages spoken by the Nivkh people in Outer Manchuria, in the basin of the Amgun (a tributary of the Amur), along the lower reaches of the Amur itself, and on the northern half of Sakhalin. "Gilyak" is the Russian rendering of terms derived from the Tungusic "Gileke" and Manchu-Chinese "Gilemi" (Gilimi, Gilyami) for culturally similar peoples of the Amur River region, and was applied principally to the Nivkh in Western literature.

The population of ethnic Nivkhs has been reasonably stable over the past century, with 4,549 Nivkhs counted in 1897 and 4,673 in 1989. However, the number of native speakers of the Nivkh language among these dropped from 100% to 23.3% in the same period, so by the 1989 census there were only 1,079 first-language speakers left. That may have been an overcount, however, as the 2010 census recorded only 198 native speakers, less than 4% of the ethnic population.

Proto-Nivkh(ic), the proto-language ancestral to the modern-day languages, has been reconstructed by Fortescue (2016).

Languages
Nivkh is a dialect continuum. There is a high degree of variability of usage among Nivkhs depending on village, clan, and even the individual speaker. Varieties are traditionally grouped into four geographic clusters. These are the lower-Amur variety, the North Sakhalin variety (spoken on the coasts around the Amur Liman, including the mainland and west Sakhalin), the East Sakhalin variety (including populations around the Tymy River), and the South Sakhalin variety (spoken around the Poronay River). The lexical and phonological differences across these varieties is great enough that specialists describe them as falling into two or three languages, though for purposes of language revival among a small and already divided population, Nivkh is generally presented as a single language, due to fears of the consequences of further division.

Gruzdeva (1998) notes that speakers of East Sakhalin and the lower Amur cannot understand each other, and divides the varieties into two languages, Nivkh proper (including the lower Amur, Northern Sakhalin / Straits and Western Sakhalin varieties) and Nighvng (the East and South Sakhalin varieties). Fortescue (2016) notes that the Amur, East Sakhalin and South Sakhalin varieties have low intelligibility with each other, and considers each of them to constitute a separate language.

Classification
Nivkh is not known to be related to any other language, making it an isolated family. For convenience, it may be included in the geographical group of Paleosiberian languages. Many words in the Nivkh languages bear a certain resemblance to words of similar meaning in other Paleosiberian languages, Ainu, Korean, or Tungusic languages, but no regular sound correspondences have been discovered to systematically account for the vocabularies of these various families, so any lexical similarities are considered to be due to chance or to borrowing.

Michael Fortescue suggested in 1998 that Nivkh might be related to the Mosan languages of North America. Later, in 2011, he argued that Nivkh, which he referred to as an "isolated Amuric language", was related to the Chukotko-Kamchatkan languages, forming a Chukotko-Kamchatkan–Amuric language family. However, Glottolog considers the evidence to be "insufficient".

In 2015, Sergei Nikolaev argued in two papers for a systematic relationship between Nivkh and the Algic languages of North America, and a more distant relationship between these two together and the Wakashan languages of coastal British Columbia.

The Nivkh languages are included in the widely rejected Eurasiatic languages hypothesis by Joseph Greenberg.

An automated computational analysis (ASJP 4) by Müller et al. (2013) found lexical similarities among Nivkh, Mongolic, and Tungusic, likely due to lexical borrowings.

Frederik Kortlandt argued that Nivkh is related to Uralo-Siberian and Indo-Uralic: some evidences for the relationship are: Uralic participle *-pa and Nivkh gerund: *-pa. The pronouns *mi, *ti compared to Nivkh: n´i and či.

Hudson & Robbeets (2020) presumed that Nivkh-like language was once distributed in Korea and became the substratum of Koreanic languages. Kim Bang-han proposed that placename glosses in the Samguk sagi reflect the original language of the Korean peninsula and a component in the formation of both Korean and Japanese. He proposed that this language was related to Nivkh. Juha Janhunen suggests the possibility that similar consonant stop systems in Koreanic and Nivkh may be due to ancient contact.

History 
The Nivkh people have lived, by many accounts for thousands of years, on the island of Sakhalin and the Amur River. They maintained trade with the neighboring Ainu, Japanese, and Chinese, until Russian contact, which began in the 17th century. The 19th century shows the first recorded decline of Nivkh numbers, with official estimates dropping from 1856 to 1889. This coincided with smallpox epidemics and the expansion of Sakhalin's prisoner population, as Russia began sending groups of its convicts to Sakhalin in 1873. At this time, reportedly few Nivkh spoke Russian.

The official Russian census reported similar numbers of ethnic Nivkhs in 1897 (4,500) and in 2002 (5,200). However, the number of native speakers among the ethnic Nivkhs dropped from 100% to 23.3% in the same period. All recorded native Nivkh speakers were bilingual in Russian, most of them were born in 1920-1940s, when a significant decline in the number of native Nivkh speakers occurred, due to Stalin's policy of collectivization imposed on indigenous economies, and in many cases, driving Nivkh individuals to hired labor, marking a departure from traditional means of subsistence. Many Nivkh were forcibly displaced from their more widely spread settlements to Nogliki, a small city, in the process of centralization. The traditional Nivkh way of life was gradually and sometimes forcibly converted to a Soviet way of life, as changes in subsistence, diet, dwellings, and education have resulted. In 2010s the Nivkh language is taught in the 1–3 grades in several schools in Sakhalin and Khabarovsk regions. A monthly newspaper "Nivkh dif" (Nivkh language) is published in Sakhalin. Nivkh language books are also regularly published in Russia.

Grammar
Nivkh is an agglutinating synthetic language. It has a developed case system, as well as other grammatical markers, but no grammatical gender. The basic word order of Nivkh is subject–object–verb, the subject being frequently omitted in speech.[9] Nivkh is notable for the high degree of incorporation between words. For example, morphemes that express spatial relationships (prepositions or postpositions in many other languages) are incorporated into the noun to which they relate. Words consist of easily definable roots and productive grammatical morphemes, most of which are suffixes. Nivkh has no adjectives, but rather verbs that describe a state of being. There are two verb tenses: non-future and future. The non-future form may combine with adverbials, as well as context, to indicate a time frame.

As Russian has become the dominant language in all spheres of life, Nivkh grammar has changed in the last century. For example, Nivkh has recently begun to mark plurals on counting nouns and pairs, a change that originated from the grammar rules of Russian. However, it has been postulated that due to the vastly differing grammatical structures of the two tongues, grammatical interference has not been extensive. Simplification has occurred past borrowed Russian structure, though; due to disuse of the language and a changing culture, many of the complex morphological aspects of Nivkh have been simplified or fallen out of use. In a process referred to as obsolescence, things like the distinction between the morpheme for counting sledges and the morpheme for counting fishnets has disappeared, with speakers opting to use more general categories of counting numbers or other descriptors.

Alphabet

Currently, the Nivkh language uses a modified Cyrillic alphabet. The sound values of each letter can be deduced from Omniglot and Tangiku's vocabulary list.

Letters in bold are only used in Russian loan words.

The letters Н and Т stands for two sounds each. When they are followed by a “soft” vowel letter, they produce the palatal consonant; otherwise they product an alveolar consonant. For example,  are written as та, тя, тъи, ти respectively.

The letters Ӷ and Ў are not used in the Amur dialect.

Phonology

Consonants

The labial fricatives are weakly articulated, and have been described as both bilabial  and labiodental . Unlike consonant alternation, this occurs also within a morpheme. The Amur dialect deletes some word-final nasals, which leads to voiced stops occurring also word-initially.

Nivkh's phonemic distinction between velar and uvular fricatives ( vs.  and  vs. ) is rare among the world's languages. These sounds do occur in a great deal of languages, but usually they are interchangeable.

Additionally, there is another context in which consonants are always palatalised, viz. before  when it's preceding a uvular consonant , e.g.  >  ‘chicken’.

Nivkh features a process of consonant alternation like in Celtic languages, in which morpheme-initial stops alternate with fricatives and trills:

  'soup'
  'duck soup'
  'kind of seal soup'
 but:  'bear soup'

Only the morpheme-initial position is affected: other clusters ending in a stop are possible within a morpheme (e.g.  "man").

In some transitive verbs, the process has been noted to apparently run in reverse (fricatives/trills fortiting to stops, with the same distribution). This has been taken a distinct process, but has also been explained to be fundamentally the same, with the citation form of these verbs containing an underlying stop, lenited due to the presence of a former i- prefix (which still survives in the citation form of other verbs, where it causes regular consonant alternation). Initial fricatives in nouns never change.

Vowels
There are these six vowels in Nivkh:

Long vowels are not a phonemic feature of Nivkh but can arise due to sentence prosody, or compensatory lengthening when fricatives are deleted after the vowel.

Stress
Stress can fall on any syllable, but tends to be on the first; there is dialectal variation, and minimal pairs distinguished by stress seem to be rare.

Language contact with the Ainu people
The Ainu appear to have experienced intensive contact with the Nivkhs during the course of their history. It is not known to what extent this has affected the language. Linguists believe the vocabulary shared between the Ainu language and Nivkh (historically spoken in the northern half of Sakhalin and on the Asian mainland facing it) is due to borrowing.

See also
List of Proto-Nivkh reconstructions (Wiktionary)

References

Bibliography

Further reading

External links

 The Nivkhs from The Red Book
 Sound Materials of the Nivkh Language The World's Largest Sound Archive of the Nivkh Language on the Web
 Nivkh alphabet and language at Omniglot
 Nivkh Folk Talkes

 
Language
Agglutinative languages
Language isolates of Asia
Languages of Russia
Manchuria
Paleosiberian languages
Polysynthetic languages
Subject–object–verb languages
Language families